Ekaterina Olegovna Fedulova is a Russian actress. Winner of the MTV Russia Movie Awards 2007 (Best Actress for  Piter FM).

Biography
Ekaterina was born on November 5, 1979. She studied at the acting department of the International Slavic Institute in Moscow.

Selected filmography

References

External links 
 Ekaterina Fedulova on kino-teatr.ru

Russian film actresses
1979 births
Living people
People from Lyubertsy